is a Japanese model and actress. Her maternal grandfather is an American.

Early life 
Sada begin modeling when she was three years old.

Career 

In 1998, she became an exclusive model for the fashion magazine Vivi.

In 2001, Sada released her debut single "Pray/discovery". In 2003, her acting debut was in the film, Tenshi no Kiba B.T.A.. In 2006, Sada launched her jewelry brand, Enasoluna.

On October 1, 2008, she married Kunichi Nomura. On April 6, 2009, they gave birth to their first child. They later gave birth to another child on November 4, 2010.

Filmography

TV series

Films

References

External links
 

Actresses from Tokyo
Japanese female models
Japanese film actresses
Japanese television actresses
Japanese women pop singers
1977 births
Living people
Singers from Tokyo
Japanese people of American descent
21st-century Japanese actresses
21st-century Japanese women singers
21st-century Japanese singers
Models from Tokyo Metropolis